Elections to Barnsley Metropolitan Borough Council were held on 2 May 1991, with one third of the council up for election. Prior to the election, the defending councillor in Penistone West had changed their affiliation from Residents to Independent, ending the Residents presence on the council that had endured since its creation in 1973. The election resulted in Labour retaining control of the council.

Election result

This resulted in the following composition of the council:

Ward results

+/- figures represent changes from the last time these wards were contested.

By-elections between 1991 and 1992

References

1991 English local elections
1991
1990s in South Yorkshire